Achhai is a village in Shivgarh block of Rae Bareli district, Uttar Pradesh, India. As of 2011, its population is 2,652 people, in 537 households.

The 1961 census recorded Achhai as comprising 8 hamlets, with a total population of 1,292 people (632 male and 660 female), in 275 households and 263 physical houses. The area of the village was given as 1,546 acres.

The 1981 census recorded Achhai as having a population of 1,594 people, in 326 households, and having an area of 625.65 hectares.

References

Villages in Raebareli district